Presidential debates may refer to: 
 Leaders' debate, which occur within Parliamentary forms of government 
 French presidential debates, held on television since 1974
 United States presidential election debates, debates that occur between the main candidates for the American president, both before and after the primary elections.